The Port of Pecém is one of the two big ports in the state of Ceará, in Brazil. It's located in the municipality of São Gonçalo do Amarante.

In the year of 2013 the port handled 6.3 million metric tons of cargo, representing an increase of 40% over the previous year.

As of 2010, the Port of Pecém entered into a phased expansion under the Brazilian government's Growth Acceleration Program (PAC2). In addition to enhanced port facilities, the expansion features large scale investments by numerous international energy and materials companies, including Petrobras and Companhia Siderúrgica do Pecém. The infrastructure developments are expected to result in rapid regional population growth through 2020, with some estimates calling for a tenfold increase during the time period.

References 

Ports and harbours of Brazil